Revell Eardley-Wilmot  (29 August 1842, in London – 14 June 1922) was a British military officer. He served in the Bengal Infantry (a unit of the Indian Army), and took part in the Bhutan Expedition (1864-1865), the Jowaki Expedition (1877-1878) and the 2nd Afghan War (1878-1880). He rose to the rank of major general and was also colonel of the 14th Bengal Lancers and was made a Companion of the Order of the Bath in the 1896 Birthday Honours.

Life
He was the third child and second son of Sir John Eardley-Wilmot, 2nd Baronet and Eliza Martha Williams.  On 23 July 1906 he married Elizabeth Toone-Smith, daughter of J W Toone-Smith.

References

1842 births
1922 deaths
Revell
British Indian Army officers
Companions of the Order of the Bath
British military personnel of the Second Anglo-Afghan War
British military personnel of the Bhutan War
Younger sons of baronets